Jogighopa is a small town located on the northern bank of the Brahmaputra River in the  Bongaigaon district in the state of Assam, India.

Within the city, there are the remains of the five rock cut caves which are assumed to be examples of Mlechchha dynasty period architecture.  The architectural site is being preserved by the Archaeological Survey of India (ASI).

Geography
Population: officially Jogighopa is not a Town. It is a Village and still under Jogighopa Gaon Panchayat. But, in the last few years, population of Jogighopa has been growing way faster, A significant aspect of Jogighopa is that it covers some important areas like Kabaitary, Chalantapara, Papermil and Balapara. Nowadays, these areas have become an integral part of Greater Jogighopa Town (Non-official) and this whole area is popularly known as Jogighopa. As per Census data of 2011, total  population  of Greater Jogighopa is 65845. It is expected that, by 2021,its population may touch the figure of 1,00,000.

Transport 
Jogighopa has a combined road-rail bridge, called Naranarayan Setu,  over the Brahmaputra River.

Jogighopa, is set to become India's gateway to  the North-East states in India  with the road ministry gearing up to develop a Multi Modal Logistics Park (MMLP) there with road, rail, waterways and air transport facilities.
The development includes railway sidings, container terminals, warehousing, non-cargo processing, a truck terminal, common facilities, support infrastructure and equipment.

A Special Purpose Vehicle, backed by the Asian Development Bank (ADB), will be created to execute the project, which will be executed in two phases—Phase I of around Rs155.46 crores and Rs115.88 crores for Phase II.

Recent developments, like the announcement of the Northeast Economic Corridor under the Bharatmala programme of the road ministry and the signing of the MoU (Memorandum of Understanding) between India and Bangladesh for developing the Dalu-Tura-Goalpara-Gelephu multimodal trade route strengthen Jogighopa's case for MMLP.
According to the draft report on the Jogighopa MMLP accessed by The Mint, freight demand in terms of volume is projected to grow at a compounded annual growth rate (CAGR) of 5.93% from 11.96 million metric tonnes (MMT) in FY17 to 33.74 MMT in FY35. The total container market is projected to grow from 4,808 TEUs (twenty-food equivalent units) in FY17 to 7,925 TEUs in FY35— @ CAGR of 2.82%.

The move comes at a time when India's neighbours are gearing up for trade. For example, Bangladesh’s development of the Khulna-Dhaka-Sylhet Economic Corridor and the Banglabandha-Dhaka-Chittagong-Cox’s Bazar Economic Corridor—to promote industrial development in the region. These initiatives are expected to accelerate freight movements in the given region and facilitate trade between India and Bangladesh, and between Bangladesh and Bhutan through India.

Since 2017, the GOI has started prioritizing the logistics sector by granting it the infrastructural status and anticipates major investments in it. The Logistic Performance Index published by the World Bank shows India jumping up 19 spots in the Global ranking from 54 in 2014 to 35 in 2016.

The decision is significant because of the sustained "Act East" policy of the National Democratic Alliance (NDA)government

Notes

External links 
 Archaeological Survey of India

References 

Cities and towns in Bongaigaon district
Bongaigaon